Riot Police is a Spanish police drama thriller television series created by Isabel Peña and Rodrigo Sorogoyen for Movistar+. The series follows a group of riot policemen and an internal affairs agent who is investigating them. The six episodes debuted on October 16, 2020 on Movistar+.

Premise 
In the midst of a messy house eviction in a corrala in Lavapiés, an African immigrant dies after falling to the ground. The police department of internal affairs takes over in order to determine if it was a case of involuntary manslaughter or negligence on the part of the six riot police agents that took part in the operation to remove the tenants.

Cast 
 Vicky Luengo as Laia Urquijo
 Raúl Arévalo as Diego López Rodero
 Álex García as Alexánder Parra Rosales
 Hovik Keuchkerian as Salvador Osorio
 Roberto Álamo as José Antonio Úbeda
 Raúl Prieto as Elías Bermejo
 Patrick Criado as Rubén Murillo
  as Moreno
 David Lorente as Rosales

Episodes

Production 

Created by Isabel Peña and Rodrigo Sorogoyen, Antidisturbios is a Movistar+ original production in collaboration with The Lab and Caballo Films. It was written by the Peña and Sorogoyen duo alongside Eduardo Villanueva. The series was filmed in 2019.

It was primarily shot on location in Madrid, the primary fictional setting, even though secondary part of the filming took part in Valencia, A Coruña and Barcelona.

Release 
Prior to its release, the first season was pre-screened in its entirety at the 68th San Sebastián International Film Festival on September 25, 2020.

The six episodes of the first season were released on October 16, 2020 on Movistar+.

In France, the series began airing on Polar+ on November 16, 2020.

International rights are distributed by Buendía Estudios.

As of 2021, HBO Max had released the series in Latin American territories.

In Portugal the series was made available through Disney+ on its Star hub, early in 2022.

Awards and nominations 

|-
| align= center rowspan="25" | 2021
| rowspan = 5 | 26th Forqué Awards
| colspan = 2 | Best TV Series
| 
| align = "center" rowspan = "5" | 
|-
| rowspan = 3 | Best Actor in a TV Series
| Hovik Keuchkerian
| 
|-
| Álex García
| 
|-
| Raúl Arévalo
| 
|-
| Best Actress in a TV Series
| Vicky Luengo
| 
|-
| rowspan=6| 8th Feroz Awards
| colspan = 2 | Best Drama Series
| 
| align = "center" rowspan = "6" | 
|-
| Best Leading Actress in a TV Series
| Vicky Luengo
| 
|-
| rowspan = 3 | Best Leading Actor in a TV Series
| Raúl Arévalo
| 
|-
| Álex García
| 
|-
| Hovik Keuchkerian
| 
|-
| Best Supporting Actor in a TV Series
| Patrick Criado
| 
|-
| 3rd ALMA Awards || Best Screenplay (drama series) || Isabel Peña, Rodrigo Sorogoyen and Eduardo Villanueva ||  || align = "center" | 
|-
| rowspan = "3" | 8th Platino Awards || colspan = "2" | Best Ibero-American Miniseries or TV series ||  || align = "center" rowspan = "3" | 
|-
| Best Series Creator || Rodrigo Sorogoyen & Isabel Peña || 
|-
| Best Supporting Actor in a Miniseries or TV series || Patrick Criado || 
|-
| rowspan = "2" | 68th Ondas Awards || colspan = "2" | Best Drama Series ||  || align = "center" rowspan = "2" | 
|-
| Best Actress in Spanish Fiction (TV) || Vicky Luengo || 
|-
| rowspan = "6" | 23rd Iris Awards || colspan = "2" | Best Fiction ||  || rowspan = "6" | 
|-
| Best Actor || Raúl Arévalo ||  
|-
| Best Actress || Vicky Luengo ||  
|-
| Best Direction || Rodrigo Sorogoyen || 
|-
| Best Screenplay || Rodrigo Sorogoyen, Isabel Peña and Eduardo Villanueva || 
|-
| Best Production || Domingo Corral, Fran Araujo, Sofía FábregasRodrigo Sorogoyen and Isabel Peña || 
|-
| rowspan = "2" | 71st Fotogramas de Plata || Best Television Actress ||Vicky Luengo ||  || rowspan = "2" | 
|-
| Best Television Actor || Álex García || 

|-
| align = "center" rowspan = "8" | 2022 || rowspan = "5" | 9th  || colspan = "2" | Best Miniseries ||  || rowspan = "5" | 
|-
| Best Direction || Rodrigo Sorogoyen, Borja Soler || 
|-
| Best Drama Actress || Vicky Luengo || 
|-
| Best Drama Actor || Hovik Keucherian || 
|-
| Best Screenplay || Isabel Peña, Rodrigo Sorogoyen, Eduardo Villanueva || 
|-
| rowspan = "3" | 30th Actors and Actresses Union Awards || rowspan = "2" | Best TV Actor in a Leading Role || Raúl Arévalo ||  || rowspan = "3" | 
|-
| Álex García || 
|-
| Best TV Actor in a Minor Role || Patrick Criado || 
|}

References

External links

2020s Spanish drama television series
2020 Spanish television series debuts
Movistar+ network series
Spanish-language television shows
Television shows set in Madrid
Law enforcement in fiction
Television shows filmed in Spain